A Woman's Story or The Story of One Woman (Italian: La storia di una donna) is a 1920 Italian silent drama film directed by Eugenio Perego and starring Pina Menichelli, Luigi Serventi and Livio Pavanelli. A single mother has to work as a high-class prostitute.

Cast
Pina Menichelli as Beatrice  
Luigi Serventi as Paolo  
Livio Pavanelli as Fabiano

References

External links

1920 films
1920 drama films
Italian drama films
Italian silent feature films
Films about prostitution in Italy
Films directed by Eugenio Perego
Italian black-and-white films
Silent drama films
1920s Italian films